In Portugal, the coast guard role is performed by several government agencies that, together, form the Maritime Authority System (SAM). The SAM includes the Portuguese Navy, the National Republican Guard (GNR), the Portuguese Air Force, the Border and Immigration Service (SEF), the Civil Protection Authority, the National Medical Emergency Institute and the Criminal Investigation Police (PJ).

The National Maritime Authority or AMN is the service responsible for coast guard duties within Portugal. Until 2014 the AMN had been a directly reporting agency of the Navy until it was separated that year, although the Navy still provides its personnel and vessels. The function of AMN is performed by the Chief of Staff of the Navy himself, supported in this role by the Directorate of the Maritime Authority, which includes the Maritime Police, the Lifeguard Institute, the Lighthouse Department and the several harbourmasters. Besides the specific assets of the Directorate of Maritime Authority entirely dedicated to the coast guard role, the AMN also has at its disposal the other Portuguese Navy's assets that can be used both for military and public service missions.

The vessels operated within the SAM include the Maritime Police patrol boats, the Lifeguard Institute lifeboats, the harbourmasters’ harbour boats, the GNR Coastal Control Unit's surveillance boats and the Portuguese Navy's naval ships. The aircraft operated within the SAM include fixed-wing aircraft from the Portuguese Air Force and helicopters from the Navy, the Air Force and the Civil Protection Authority.

Vessels 
In addition to the vessels in the list below, all the Portuguese Navy ships also belong to the Maritime Authority System.

References

Coast guards
Government of Portugal
Law enforcement in Portugal
Maritime law enforcement agencies